Xing Huina (born February 25, 1984, in Hanting, Weifang, Shandong) is a Chinese track and field athlete.

Biography
Xing was born to family of farmers in Hanting, Weifang, Shandong.  Standing 1.66 m tall and weighing 50 kg (110 lb), she began training at Weifang City Sport School, coached by Chi Yuzhai. She joined the Shandong Sport Technology Institute in 1999, coached by Yin Yanqin.

She was selected into national team in 2002 after running 4:10.43 in 1500 m and 14:56.15 in 5000 m in 2001 Chinese National Games. In national team, she was coached by Wang Dexian. In 2002, she won bronze medal in 10,000 m in Busan Asian Games with 31:42.36. She was the first Asian athlete to be crowned the Olympic champion in this competition.
In 2003, she came in 7th and broke the World Junior Record (30:31.55) in the memorable race of 10,000m at Saint-Denis World Championships. The record was broken by Linet Masai of Kenya at the 2008 Olympics in Beijing.

Xing won the gold medal in the 10,000 m race in the track and field competition at the 2004 Summer Olympics in Athens, Greece with 30:24.36. She overtook Ethiopian Ejagayehu Dibaba in the final straight to break the monopoly of Ethiopians, becoming the first Asian to ever have won an Olympic gold medal in women's 10,000 metres. In the 2005 World Championships in Helsinki, she placed 5th in women's 5000 m (14:43.64) and 4th in women's 10,000 m (30:27.18). Both races were won by Ethiopian runners. She decided not to compete at the 2009 National Games of China in 2009 due to a persistent leg injury. The combination of the injury and her long period away from competition raised speculation that her professional career was finished at the age of 26.

Personal bests
1500 m: 4:09.01 (2003)
5000 m: 14:43.64 (2005)
10,000 m: 30:24.36 (2004)

Her unofficial 1500 m personal best is 4:03.00, which was set at the 2005 National Games of China. However, the result was nullified because her opponent, Liu Qing filed a complaint of being deliberately blocked by Xing when Liu tried overtaking Xing.

References

External links

1984 births
Living people
Athletes (track and field) at the 2004 Summer Olympics
Chinese female long-distance runners
Olympic athletes of China
Olympic gold medalists for China
People from Weifang
Asian Games medalists in athletics (track and field)
Runners from Shandong
Athletes (track and field) at the 2002 Asian Games
Medalists at the 2004 Summer Olympics
Olympic gold medalists in athletics (track and field)
Asian Games bronze medalists for China
Medalists at the 2002 Asian Games